The Gușoianca is a right tributary of the river Pesceana in Romania. It flows into the Pesceana in Streminoasa.

References

Rivers of Romania
Rivers of Vâlcea County